Torquigener vicinus is a species of fish in the family Tetraodontidae. It is found in the coastal waters of southwestern Australia.

References

Tetraodontidae
Taxa named by Gilbert Percy Whitley
Fish described in 1930